Johns Creek is a city in Fulton County, Georgia, United States. According to the 2020 census, the population was 82,453. The city is a northeastern suburb of Atlanta.

History

 

In the early 19th century, the Johns Creek area was dotted with trading posts along the Chattahoochee River in what was then Cherokee territory. The Cherokee nation at the time was a confederacy of agrarian villages led by a chief. However, after Europeans colonized the area, the Cherokee developed an alphabet, and a legislature and judiciary system patterned after the American model.

Some trading posts gradually became crossroads communities where pioneer families – Rogers, McGinnis, Findley, Buice, Cowart, Medlock and others – gathered to visit and sell their crops.

By 1820, the community of Sheltonville (now known as Shakerag) was a ferry crossing site, with the McGinnis Ferry and Rogers Ferry carrying people and livestock across the river for a small fee. Further south, the Nesbit Ferry did the same near another crossroads community known as Newtown.

A few Cherokees remained, the most famous being Sarah Cordery (1785–1842), the half-blood Cherokee wife of pioneer John Rogers (1774–1851), and their 12 children. Rogers was a respected, influential plantation owner and colleague of President Andrew Jackson. Rogers's 1828 home – today, a private residence in Johns Creek – was an overnight stop-over for Jackson. Much later, the home was also visited by famed humorist Will Rogers, the great, great-nephew of John Rogers. Johns Creek's name comes from John Rogers's son, Johnson K. Rogers. A local tributary was named after him, and the name "Johns Creek" eventually came to be the name of the area.

In 1831, much of the land in the former Cherokee Nation north of the Chattahoochee was combined into the massive Cherokee County. When Milton County was formed in 1858, the Johns Creek area was folded into it.

In the 1930s, during the Great Depression, Milton County was dissolved and all of its land was then absorbed into Fulton County.

The four main crossroad communities — Ocee, Newtown, Shakerag and Warsaw — remained the social, educational and business centers of rural, unincorporated northeast Fulton County. For the next 50 years, these communities helped bring a sense of identity to this largely undeveloped and underpopulated area, as the nearby cities of Roswell, Alpharetta, Duluth and Suwanee and adjoining Forsyth and Gwinnett counties continued to grow and develop.

In 1981, a group of Georgia Institute of Technology graduates bought  of farmland and woods near McGinnis Ferry and Medlock Bridge Roads for a high-tech office park. The new office park was to mirror one built in 1970 in nearby Peachtree Corners, known as Technology Park/Atlanta. Spotting tiny Johns Creek on an old map, they named their mixed-use, master-planned community "Technology Park/Johns Creek". This is the first reference to Johns Creek as a place. With the jobs came houses and shopping centers, and the population increased to about 60,000.

By 2000, a grassroots movement to incorporate the Johns Creek area into a city was slowly developing. Residents wanted more control over issues such as traffic, growth, development and quality of life. They also sought a level of service that was a challenge for the sprawling Fulton County to provide. Following the nearby city of Sandy Springs’ successful incorporation in 2005, a legislative campaign was started to incorporate the Johns Creek community. House Bill 1321 was passed by the state legislature, signed by Gov. Sonny Perdue in March 2006, and approved by the residents of northeast Fulton County in a July 18, 2006 voter referendum. In November 2006, the city's first elected officials were voted into office, with the City of Johns Creek becoming official December 1, 2006.

Newtown Elementary School, built in 1929, is Johns Creek's only listing on the National Register of Historic Places. It was listed in  August 2006, with location described as "near Alpharetta", before Johns Creek's incorporation was completed.

In 2017, an iHeartJC initiative has been growing to have the city's residential, business and innovation ecosystem develop a long-term strength and identity in healthcare innovation and wellness. The resolution passed a year later.

Geography
Johns Creek is located in northeastern Fulton County and is centered at  (34.0289259, -84.1985790). Johns Creek is bounded to the south by the Chattahoochee River and Gwinnett County, and on the northeast by McGinnis Ferry Road and Forsyth County. It is bounded by Roswell to the west, Alpharetta to the northwest, Suwanee to the east, and Duluth, Berkeley Lake, and Peachtree Corners to the south.

Climate
Johns Creek has a humid subtropical climate (Köppen climate classification Cfa).

<div style="width:75%">

</div style>

Demographics

2020 census

As of the 2020 United States census, there were 82,453 people, 28,638 households, and 23,283 families residing in the city.

2010 census
According to the 2010 U.S. census, 76,728 people live in the city of Johns Creek, a 27.1 percent increase since a 2000 estimate for Georgia's 10th largest city. The racial makeup of the city in the 2010 U.S. census was 63.5 percent White; 23.4 percent Asian (8.4% Asian Indian, 6.5% Korean, 5.7% Chinese, 0.5% Vietnamese, 0.5% Japanese, 0.5% Pakistani, 0.4% Filipino, 0.1% Bangladeshi, 0.1% Indonesian, 0.1% Thai, 0.1% Cambodian, 0.1% Laotian); 9.2 percent African American; 5.2 percent Hispanic or Latino of any race (1.6% Mexican, 0.8% Puerto Rican, 0.7% Colombian, 0.4% Cuban, 0.2% Peruvian, 0.2% Dominican, 0.2% Venezuelan, 0.1% Guatemalan, 0.1% Honduran, 0.1% Salvadoran, 0.1% Chilean, 0.1% Argentinean, 0.1% Ecuadorian, 0.1% Spanish); 0.1 percent Native American; 1.4 percent from other races; and 2.4 percent from two or more races.

Johns Creek's 2010 demographics showed an estimated $109,576 median household income, a  $137,271 average household income and a $45,570 per capita income.

Economy

Top employers
According to the City's 2021 Annual Comprehensive Financial Report, the top employers in the city are:

Arts and culture

Johns Creek has metro Atlanta's only part-time, fully professional symphony orchestra, the Johns Creek Symphony Orchestra. Under the leadership of Music Director J. Wayne Baughman, the orchestra performs several times each year.

The Johns Creek Arts Center offers classes and camps for aspiring artists in multiple media throughout the year.

There also are several festivals year-round, such as Founders Week in December in which the community celebrates the city's incorporation with activities and a parade. The Fall Family Festival in September is a community get-together at Newtown Park. Arts on the Creek is a juried art show, and also has musical and stage performers. "The Taste of Johns Creek" is an annual food festival in the fall that features more than 40 local restaurants with proceeds supporting public school extracurricular activities.

There are six golf facilities (five private, one public) in Johns Creek, including the renowned Atlanta Athletic Club, home of the 2011 PGA Championship and the 2014 U.S. Amateur. Other golf facilities include Country Club of the South, Rivermont Golf and Country Club, River Pines Golf, St. Ives Country Club, and The Standard Club.

The Atlanta Athletic Club was the site of the inaugural Atlanta Tennis Championships in 2010. Johns Creek is home to thousands of members of the Atlanta Lawn Tennis Association (ALTA), one of the largest and oldest organized recreation leagues in the country.

It has shoals and low-level rapids. It also offers prime trout fishing.

Biking the  Greenway along Georgia 141 is a popular pastime. The city has plans to develop and connect other pathways to the Greenway, which will tie in with other cities, adding several miles of trails.

Atlanta-Fulton Public Library System operates the Northeast Spruill Oaks Library and Ocee Regional Library.

Johns Creek International Festival
Each April, the city hosts the annual Johns Creek International Festival. In 2017, over 23,000 visitors attended the event. It is one of the most culturally diverse cities in the state and nation, representing many countries and cultures from around the world. This free community event features restaurants and food trucks, vendors, international beer and wine garden, live music and dance performances, and fun kids’ activities.

Education

Public schools are operated by Fulton County Schools.  Schools located in Johns Creek include:
 Elementary schools
 Abbotts Hill Elementary School
 Barnwell Elementary School
 Dolvin Elementary School
 Findley Oaks Elementary School
 Medlock Bridge Elementary School
 Ocee Elementary School
 Shakerag Elementary School
 State Bridge Crossing Elementary School
 Wilson Creek Elementary School
 Middle schools Autrey Mill, River Trail, and Taylor Road
 High schools Chattahoochee, Johns Creek and Northview

Private schools:
Perimeter School (Grades K-8)
Providence Christian Academy - Johns Creek Campus (Grades 9–12)
Woodward Academy - North Campus
 Cresco Montessori School
 Mount Pisgah Christian School (Grades Preschool- 12)
 Holy Redeemer Catholic School of the Roman Catholic Archdiocese of Atlanta. - The school opened in fall 1999.

Infrastructure

Transportation

Major highways
 State Route 120
 State Route 141
 State Route 140

Public transportation
Johns Creek is not directly served by MARTA trains or buses. GRTA Xpress Route 408 connects Johns Creek with the Doraville MARTA station.

Pedestrians and cycling
In January 2018 significant plans were approved for the engineering phase to upgrade State Bridge Road and Pleasant Hill Road. There is community-wide support from the community in both neighboring Johns Creek and Duluth for the pedestrian river bridge for the project. It will serve to improve bike pedestrian safety, boost local economies by improving access to businesses, enhance connections with surrounding neighborhoods and improve traffic flow in the area. In addition, the upgrade will serve to ease inspection and maintenance of the bridge in the future.

In March 2018, the Gwinnett County Commissioners approved the agreement with the Johns Creek City Council. Both sides have agreed to remove the sidewalks from the existing bridges in order to widen the roads. To improve safety for pedestrians, a new pedestrian bridge will be constructed on one side of the river. A pedestrian underpass linking both sides of the wider road is being considered to further improve access and provide for a safer crossing of the road.

The Rogers bridge project is another significant plan is to connect to Duluth via reconstructing a bike/pedestrian bridge across the Chattahoochee River. The engineers will determine whether to replace or rehabilitate the existing Rogers Bridge over the Chattahoochee River, will take into account the environmental impacts of each option, and will restore the working bike/pedestrian connection between Duluth and Johns Creek. This will allow access to the planned 133 acre parkland under development in Johns Creek, and will allow Fulton County residents access to Rogers Bridge Park, the Chattapoochee Dog Park, and the Western Gwinnett Bikeway currently under development by Gwinnett County.

Law enforcement
The Johns Creek Police Department launched April 27, 2008, and the fire department launched October 27, 2008. The police department was certified by the Georgia Association of Chiefs of Police and accredited by the Commission on Accreditation for Law Enforcement within two years of the department's formation.

Notes

References

External links

 City of Johns Creek official website

Cities in Fulton County, Georgia
Cities in Georgia (U.S. state)
Cities in the Atlanta metropolitan area
Populated places established in 2006
2006 establishments in Georgia (U.S. state)